Deck the Halls, Bruise Your Hand is the first Christmas album released by Christian rock band Relient K.  It was released in many stores as a combo pack with later copies of their previous full-length album, Two Lefts Don't Make a Right...but Three Do.

On October 23, 2007, the band re-released this album with seven new songs, and the new title of Let it Snow, Baby... Let it Reindeer.

Track listing
All tracks public domain unless otherwise noted. New verses on tracks 3 and 6 written by Matt Thiessen.

"Angels We Have Heard on High" – 1:53
"Deck the Halls" – 1:20
"12 Days of Christmas" – 3:30
"Silent Night / Away in a Manger" – 2:18
"I Celebrate the Day" (Matt Thiessen) – 3:18
"We Wish You a Merry Christmas" – 2:11
"Santa Claus Is Thumbing to Town" (Thiessen) – 2:47
"Handel's Messiah (The Hallelujah Chorus)" – 1:09
"I Hate Christmas Parties" (Thiessen) – 4:34‡
"Auld Lang Syne" – 4:05 (Later versions)  – 1:59)

‡Performed by Matthew Thiessen and the Earthquakes

Personnel 
Relient K
 Matt Thiessen – lead vocals, guitars, acoustic piano
 Matt Hoopes – guitars, backing vocals
 Brian Pittman – bass
 Dave Douglas – drums, backing vocals

Production 
 Mark Lee Townsend – producer 
 Matt Thiessen – co-producer
 J.R. McNeeley – mixing

Notes 

2003 Christmas albums
Christmas albums by American artists
Relient K albums
Gotee Records albums
Rock Christmas albums